The 12"/50 caliber Mark 7 gun (spoken "twelve-inch-fifty-caliber") was a United States Navy's naval gun that first entered service in 1912.

Design and development
The /50 caliber Mark 7 naval gun was only a slight improvement over the preceding American naval gun, the 12"/45 caliber Mark 5 gun. As such, it was a very similar weapon, having been lengthened by five calibers to allow for improved muzzle velocity, range, and penetrating power.  Designed to the specifications of the Bureau of Ordnance, the Mark 7 was constructed at the U.S. Naval Gun Factory in Washington, D.C.

Bethlehem Steel built the first gun, No. 180. Mod 0, Nos. 181, 182, and 186–200, was a built-up gun consisting of a tube, jacket, and eight hoops, a screw-box liner with locking hoops and rings and hand operated and Smith-Asbury mechanism. The gun was constructed with nickel-steel and hooped to the muzzle.

Mod 1 was gun No. 180, rebuilt into gun No. 180L, with its chase hoops rebuilt along with a new conical nickel-steel liner, a smaller chamber, and the rifling increased.

Mod 2, gun Nos. 183–185, was a Mod 0 gun relined with a conical liner, a new chase locking hoop, and with a locking ring added. It also had a -smaller chamber.

The Mod 3 guns, Nos. 211–216, were the last new guns built, all other Mods were Mod 0, 2, or 3 guns that were modified. These guns were built with a new simplified design, no liner, five hoops, a locking ring, along with a screw-box liner and a different gas check seat.

With the Mod 5 an attempt was made to reline a Mod 1 with a uniform twist rifling, but it was dropped. Mod 6 relined Mod 2 with a uniform twist rifling along with a modified new chase hoop and locking ring. Mod 7 took the Mod 3 and used a one-step conical liner, uniform twist rifling, and added a tube and liner locking ring. Mod 8 was the Mod 0 or Mod 4 also using a one-step conical liner, uniform twist rifling that was secured by a tube and liner locking ring with a liner locking collar at the breech end. The Mod 8s that used Mod 0 guns also added a new chase hoop and locking ring. Mod 9 was a Mod 2 or Mod 6 that had a new liner with longitudinal clearances at the liner shoulders installed, uniform twist rifling along with a tube and liner locking ring and collar added at the breech end. Mod 10, like the Mod 9, was also a Mod 2 or Mod 6 that had a new liner with longitudinal clearance at the liner shoulders installed, uniform twist rifling along with a tube and liner locking ring and collar added at the breech end. The Mod 10 used Breech Mechanism Mark 9 instead of the Mark 8 on the previous Mods. Mod 11 was a Mod 7 that had the chamber lengthened, adding , and a 3½° breech band seating slope and used Breech Mechanism Mark 12. Mod 12 used a Mod 10 and lengthened the chamber and added a 3½° breech band seating slope with Mod 13 being similar but of a Mod 8, Mod 14 used a Mod 9, Mod 15 used a Mod 7, Mod 16 used a Mod 10, Mod 17 used a Mod 8, and Mod 18 a Mod 9. Mod 19, the last modification, used a Mod 2 with its breech modified for the Smith-Asbury Breech Mechanism and the forward end of the chamber modified similar to the Mod 18, lengthened the chamber and added a 3½° breech band seating slope. The breech end was further modified by being machined out so that it could accommodate a gas check seat liner locking ring. The Mod 19 could also be used right or left handed by cutting a new slide keyway that was 180° from the original keyway.

Naval Service

Notes

References

Books
 
Online sources

External links
 Bluejackets Manual, 1917, 4th revision: US Navy 14-inch Mark 1 gun

Naval guns of the United States
305 mm artillery